Martin Charles Raff  (born 15 January 1938) is a Canadian/British biologist and researcher who is an Emeritus Professor at the MRC Laboratory for Molecular Cell Biology (LMCB) at University College London (UCL). His research has been in immunology, cell biology, and developmental neurobiology.

Early life
Raff was born and educated in Montreal, where he obtained his Bachelor of Science degree in 1959 and an M.D.C.M. in 1963, both from McGill University.

Career
Raff was an intern and assistant resident in medicine at the Royal Victoria Hospital, Montreal (1963–65) and a resident in neurology at the Massachusetts General Hospital in Boston (1965–68). He did postdoctoral research in immunology with Avrion Mitchison at the National Institute for Medical Research in Mill Hill, London (1968–1971), after which he moved to University College London, where he has been since 1971. He served as president of the British Society of Cell Biology (1991–95). He retired from active science in 2002, but he continued to serve on various scientific advisory boards in Europe and America until 2018. After his first retirement, when his grandson was diagnosed with autism, he became interested in the neurobiological basis of autism. He is co-author of two widely used cell biology textbooks: Molecular Biology of the Cell and Essential Cell Biology.

Awards and honours
Raff has received the following awards for his research:
1974: Nominated a member of the European Molecular Biology Organization (EMBO)
1985: Elected a Fellow of the Royal Society (FRS)
1988: Member of Academia Europaea (MAE)
1989: Feldberg Prize given by Feldberg Foundation
1989: Honorary Member of the American Neurological Society
1998: Inaugural Fellow of the Academy of Medical Sciences (FMedSci)
1999: Foreign Honorary Member of the American Academy of Arts and Sciences
2001: Hamdan Award for Medical Research Excellence, awarded by Sheikh Hamdan bin Rashid Al Maktoum Award for Medical Sciences, United Arab Emirates
2003: International Member of the National Academy of Sciences
2005: Honorary Degree, McGill University
2006: The Biochemical Society Award
2007: Honorary Degree, Vrije Universiteit Brussel
2010: DART/NYU Biotechnology Achievement Award in Basic Science

Personal life
Raff's son  is also a scientist.

References

1938 births
Living people
Academics of University College London
Autism researchers
Canadian emigrants to England
Canadian immunologists
Canadian neuroscientists
Commanders of the Order of the British Empire
Fellows of the Royal Society
McGill University Faculty of Medicine alumni
Foreign associates of the National Academy of Sciences
Canadian molecular biologists
People from Montreal